Flight Lieutenant Suhas Biswas, AC (9 September 1924 – 1 September 1957) was an Officer in the Indian Air Force who was the first Air Force Officer to be awarded the Ashoka Chakra, India's highest peacetime military award, in the year of 1953.

Early life
Suhas Biswas was born in a Bengali Christian family in Kolkata, West Bengal, the son of Samuel Biswas and  Diana Biswas. After completing his education Biswas joined the Indian Air Force as a pilot in 1944 and became a commissioned officer.

Credits
In 1952 Biswas was working in a Communication Flight unit in Lucknow. On 3 February 1952 senior army officials were returning to New Delhi after an official visit. Biswas was in control of their aircraft. Soon after it took off a crew member observed an engine malfunction; subsequently a fire broke out. Biswas first tried to extinguish it, but it was getting difficult to control the aircraft. He decided to attempt a forced landing, and made a belly landing at Sandila village located in Uttar Pradesh and successfully saved the lives of all the passengers. Biswas was awarded the Ashoka Chakra, (India Highest Peacetime Military Decoration) for his extraordinary example of Valour, Courageous Actions, intelligence and rationality.

Death
Biswas died in a crash on 1 September 1957 while he was flying a Dakota aircraft towards Mangalore on an operational mission. The aircraft crashed in Nilgiri mountains range.

References 

1924 births
1957 deaths
Recipients of the Ashoka Chakra (military decoration)
Indian Air Force officers
Indian aviators
Indian Christians
People from Kolkata
Ashoka Chakra